The Mark 33 torpedo was the first passive acoustic antisurface ship/antisubmarine homing torpedo intended for the United States Navy to employ a cast aluminum shell. It featured two speeds – high and low, and was meant to be launched from submarines and aircraft.

Production of the Mark 33 was discontinued at the end of World War II, but its features were incorporated into the Mark 35 torpedo.

See also
American 21 inch torpedo

References

Torpedoes
Torpedoes of the United States
Unmanned underwater vehicles